The list of ship launches in 1706 includes a chronological list of some ships launched in 1706.


References

1706
Ship launches